Kazi Sabyasachi (died in ) was a Bengali elocutionist. He was the eldest surviving son of one of the most prolific Bengali poets of the 20th century Kazi Nazrul Islam.

Sabyasachi came to fame in the 1960s and '70s as a reciter.
In 1966, he became the first to record the recitation of Bidrohi, a poem by Kazi Nazrul Islam.

Early life and family
Sabyasachi was the eldest surviving son of one of the most prolific Bengali poets of the 20th century Kazi Nazrul Islam. His family traced their origins to the Burdwan district in West Bengal.

Legacy
In 2012, the Ministry of Cultural Affairs of the Government of Bangladesh initiated Kazi Sabyasachi Memorial Award for two elocutionists - one from Bangladesh and one from India.

Recipients of the award is listed below:
2012 - Kazi Abu Zafar Siddiqui.
2016 - Soumitra Chatterjee and Kazi Arif

References

1979 deaths
Bangladeshi artists
Kazi Nazrul Islam
People from Paschim Bardhaman district
Bangladeshi people of Indian descent
Elocutionists